Rodolfo Pereira de Castro (born 12 April 1995), known as Rodolfo, is a Brazilian football player who plays for Figueirense FC.

Club career
He made his professional debut in the Campeonato Mineiro for Boa on 6 March 2016 in a game against Uberlândia.

References

External links

1995 births
Sportspeople from Minas Gerais
Living people
Brazilian footballers
Brazilian expatriate footballers
Boa Esporte Clube players
Clube Atlético Mineiro players
Académico de Viseu F.C. players
Guarani FC players
Moto Club de São Luís players
Figueirense FC players
Liga Portugal 2 players
Campeonato Brasileiro Série D players
Association football goalkeepers
Brazilian expatriate sportspeople in Portugal
Expatriate footballers in Portugal